Byrd is a surname, a variant spelling of the English word "bird," which is derived from the Old English pre-7th-century word "bridde" (Middle English "brid" or "bird"). Another common variant of this surname is "Bird."

Origin and variants 

Byrd is a metonymic occupational or descriptive name that was originally used for a person who worked as a bird catcher (name shortened from "birdclever"), or someone who had bird-like characteristics (i.e., bright eyed or active, or perhaps one with a beautiful singing voice). Retrieved 23 June 2018</ref> A part of the ancient legacy of the Anglo-Saxon tribes in Britain, the surname Byrd was first found in Cheshire at Broxton, a village and civil parish in North West England. The surname was first recorded in Essex towards the end of the 12th Century as "Le Brid(d)."

Until the gradual standardization of English spelling in the last few centuries, English lacked any comprehensive system of spelling. Consequently, spelling variations in names are frequently found in early Anglo-Saxon and later Anglo-Norman documents, meaning that a person's name was often spelled several different ways over a lifetime. As such, different variations of the Byrd surname usually have the same origin.

Notable people with the surname 

Alma W. Byrd (1924–2017), American politician
Bill Byrd (1907–1991), baseball player
Bobby Byrd (1934–2007), American R&B and soul singer, songwriter, and musician
Butch Byrd (born 1941), AFL Hall of Fame
Charles Willing Byrd (1770–1828), first sitting justice on the United States District Court of Ohio
Charlie Byrd (1925–1999), American jazz guitarist
Chris Byrd (born 1970), heavyweight champion in boxing
Conley Byrd (1925–2014), Justice of the Arkansas Supreme Court
Curley Byrd (1889–1970), American university administrator, educator, athlete, coach, and politician
Damiere Byrd (born 1993), American football player
Darryl Byrd (born 1960), American football player
David Edward Byrd (born 1941), an American graphic designer and painter
Dennis Byrd (1966–2016), American football player
Donald Byrd (1932–2013), American jazz trumpeter
Harry Byrd (baseball) (1925–1985)
Harry F. Byrd (1887–1966), U.S. senator for Virginia
Harry F. Byrd Jr. (1914–2013), U.S. senator for Virginia from 1965 until 1983
Henry Roeland Byrd (1918–1980), blues musician
Imhotep Gary Byrd, radio host and musician
Jairus Byrd (born 1986), American football player 
James Byrd Jr. (1949–1998), murder victim
Jefferson Byrd (born 1971), American politician
Jerry Byrd (1920–2005), American lap steel guitarist
Joseph Byrd (born 1937), rock musician
Jonathan Byrd (musician) (born circa 1970), folk singer-songwriter
Leo Byrd (born 1937), American basketball player
Marlon Byrd (born 1977), baseball player
Mary E. Byrd (1849–1934), American educator
Mary Willing Byrd (1740–1814), second wife of Colonel William Byrd III
Paul Byrd (born 1970), baseball player
Petri Hawkins-Byrd (born 1957), bailiff "Byrd" on the Judge Judy TV series
Richard Byrd (American football) (born 1962), former gridiron football player
Richard E. Byrd (1888–1957), admiral, polar explorer, aviator
Robert Byrd (1917–2010), U.S. Senator, Democrat from West Virginia
Sammy Byrd (1910–1981), baseball player for the New York Yankees and PGA Tour golfer
Steve Byrd (1955–2016), English rock musician
Thomas Jefferson Byrd (1950–2020), American actor
Tracy Byrd (boxer) (born 1964)
Tracy Byrd (born 1966), country singer
William Byrd (1540–1623), English composer
William Byrd I (1652–1704), member of colonial Virginia's House of Burgesses
William Byrd II (1674–1744), founder of Richmond, Virginia
William Byrd III (1728–1777), member of the House of Burgesses, and military officer
Winifred Byrd (1884–1970), American concert pianist

See also
Byrd (disambiguation)
Bird (disambiguation)
Robert J. W. Byrde (1922–2010), English mycologist and phytopathologist

References

English-language surnames
Surnames from nicknames